Play with Me may refer to:

Songs
 "Play with Me" (song), a 1989 song by Extreme
 "Play with Me (Jane)", a 1992 song by Thompson Twins
 "Spiel mit Mir" ("Play with Me"), a song by Rammstein from Sehnsucht

Albums
 Play with Me (album), a 2003 album by Lene
 Play with Me, a 2012 album by Nigar Jamal
 You/Play with Me, an EP by Bullet for My Valentine

Other media
 Play with Me, a 1994 performance-art piece by Mariko Mori

See also 
 Come Play with Me (disambiguation)